Jharome Peña is a Filipino professional pool player. During the WPA World Nine-ball Championship in 2006, he advanced to the round of 32, but was then eliminated by former world snooker champion Steve Davis of Great Britain.

References 

Living people
Year of birth missing (living people)
Filipino pool players
Place of birth missing (living people)